The 1957 Villanova Wildcats football team represented the Villanova University during the 1957 NCAA University Division football season. The head coach was Frank Reagan, coaching his fourth season with the Wildcats. The team played their home games at Villanova Stadium in Villanova, Pennsylvania.

Schedule

References

Villanova
Villanova Wildcats football seasons
Villanova Wildcats football